MusicAL was a 24-hour Albanian television music channel.

MusicAL was owned by Top Media which also owns Top Channel and Digitalb. MusicAL was available via Digitalb on satellite and terrestrial, and via Home2US in North America.

Digitalb television networks

The channel closed down in November 2017.

The channel was replaced by Folklorit. The new channel is now completely independent of Top media and no longer broadcasts on Digitalb. Folklorit Tv now broadcasts free of charge in Albania on digital terrestrial Tv and also on OTT Klani Im in Europe, North America and the world.  

Television channels and stations disestablished in 2017
Defunct television networks in Albania